Astrid Souply (born 21 July 1993) is a French female former volleyball player, playing as a right side hitter. She was part of the France women's national volleyball team.

She competed at the 2013 Women's European Volleyball Championship. On club level she played for Amiens Volley.

References

External links
 
http://www.aspttmulhousevolley.fr/composition/astrid-souply-2/
http://www.scoresway.com/?sport=volleyball&page=player&id=6565

1993 births
Living people
French women's volleyball players
Sportspeople from Reims
Competitors at the 2013 Mediterranean Games
Mediterranean Games competitors for France